Citi Trends is an American retail clothing chain selling discounted products targeted primarily at urban customers.

The company opened its first store in Savannah, Georgia in 1958 under the name Allied Department Stores. The company began renaming its stores Citi Trends in 2000, and officially became Citi Trends in 2001.

Citi Trends comprises more than 600+ stores in 33 states. The chain is known for targeting urban, lower-income customers. In May, 2005, Citi Trends had become a publicly traded company on the Nasdaq exchange with the symbol CTRN. The headquarters of Citi Trends is located in Savannah, Georgia. There is also a distribution center in Darlington, South Carolina along with one in Roland, Oklahoma. On February 28, 2005, Citi Trends Inc. went public in an initial public offering of stock worth up to $57.5 million.

In March 2017, Chief Executive Jason Mazzola resigned after two years in the position and five years at the company. Chief Financial Officer and Chief Operating Officer Bruce Smith will step in as acting CEO until a permanent replacement can be found.

A Citi Trends store was among the property locations destroyed by arson during the George Floyd protests in Minneapolis–Saint Paul in May 2020.

References

Companies based in Savannah, Georgia
American companies established in 1958
Retail companies established in 1958
Clothing retailers of the United States
1958 establishments in Georgia (U.S. state)
Companies listed on the Nasdaq